Rhamphorrhina bertolonii is a beetle belonging to the family Scarabaeidae. The species was first described by Hippolyte Lucas in 1879.

Description
Basic color of the elytra is gray, while pronotum may be bright green or orange reddish.

Distribution
This species can be found in Tanzania.

Etymology
The name honours Giuseppe Bertoloni.

References

Endemic fauna of Tanzania
Insects of Tanzania
Beetles described in 1879